Las Vegas Mobsters is an American soccer team based in Las Vegas, Nevada. Founded in 2013, the team plays in the United Premier Soccer League (UPSL), the fifth tier of the American Soccer Pyramid, in the Nevada Division. Their inaugural season was in 2014, competing in the Western Conference of the Premier Development League. The Mobsters finished 4th in the Mountain Division their first season.

Year-by-year

Players

Current roster
As of May 18, 2015.

Current staff
As of December 2016
  Martin Melendrez - Chief Financial Officer
  George McKenna - Head Coach
  Kyle McKenna - Assistant Coach
 Julian Portugal - Strength and Conditioning Coach
  Tyler Scull - General Manager
  Forrest Smith - Director of Player Development
  John Fayeghi - Director of Hospitality and Entertainment
  Tyson Johnson - Director of Marketing
  Theresa Lloyd - Club Administrator
  Christian Soler - Director of Social Media and Media Relations

Club Culture

Supporters
Locals organized a Las Vegas Mobsters supporters group called the Mob Squad during the Mobsters inaugural season .

Rivalries
In 2015 the members of the Mob Squad along with FC Tucson supporters Cactus Pricks, and Albuquerque Sol FC supporters the Sandianistas announced the Copa Frontera, an annual series with Las Vegas Mobsters, FC Tucson and Albuquerque Sol FC, all current PDL teams in the Western Conference's newly-formed Mountain Division.  The club earning the most points in the 6 regular-season meetings is awarded The Copa Frontera Trophy for the following year.

References 

Association football clubs established in 2013
Sports teams in Las Vegas
USL League Two teams
2013 establishments in Nevada
Soccer clubs in Nevada